Under the law of England and Wales regarding insanity and unfitness to plead, once a court has determined that the defendant is subject to a disability that prevents their trial progressing, there may be a "trial of the facts" in which the truth of the allegations against the defendant, as opposed to their guilt or innocence of a crime, is to be determined. The court's options are: to order an absolute discharge; a supervision order; or a hospital order (with or without a restriction order).

The trial is not  a criminal trial to determine guilt or otherwise; it is "limited to ensuring that the interference with the liberty of the defendant consequent upon whatever order might be made following an adverse finding can be justified by reference to what can be proved about what he or she did, even if intention might have been clouded by delusion or other incapacity."

References

See also 
 Trier of fact

English law
Criminal procedure